The Chameleon (Dmitri Smerdyakov; Russian: Дмитрий Смердяков) is a supervillain appearing in American comic books published by Marvel Comics. He is the first ever adversary of the superhero Spider-Man, having debuted in the initial issue of The Amazing Spider-Man (March 1963). The character is usually depicted as a master of disguises, known for his ability to impersonate virtually anybody. He is also the half-brother of Kraven the Hunter.

The character has appeared in several Spider-Man media adaptations over the years, including animated television series and video games. In live-action, Numan Acar portrayed Smerdyakov in the Marvel Cinematic Universe (MCU) film Spider-Man: Far From Home (2019), while Fred Hechinger is set to appear as the character in the upcoming Sony's Spider-Man Universe (SSU) film Kraven the Hunter (2023)

Publication history
Created by writer Stan Lee and artist Steve Ditko, the character first appeared in The Amazing Spider-Man #1 (March 1963), making him the first member of Spider-Man's rogues' gallery, based on issue publication date, excluding the burglar who murdered Ben Parker (Supercharger was the first Spider-Man supervillain chronologically). He is also the half-brother of Kraven the Hunter; this relationship helped evolve him as a major villain compared to his original depiction of being just a solo villain in the original issue of The Amazing Spider-Man.

Fictional character biography
Dmitri Smerdyakov was born in Soviet Russia. In his youth, he became a servant and half-brother to Sergei Kravinoff, and later a minor associate of Gustav Fiers. Although Dmitri and Sergei were friends, Sergei was often abusive to Smerdyakov, leading to a combination of admiration and resentment towards Kravinoff. Eventually, Smerdyakov emigrated to the United States of America. As he had made a talent for himself during his youth by impressing his brother by impersonating friends and neighbors, he assumed an even more impressive disguise: the identity of Chameleon. During his first known criminal outing, he impersonated Spider-Man, though he was soon exposed and arrested. Shortly afterward, Sergei (now known as "Kraven the Hunter") came to America, and the Chameleon set his old associate's sights on Spider-Man. Both men became long-time enemies of Spider-Man, part of his primary rogues' gallery.

The Chameleon inspired Kraven to begin hunting Spider-Man, inviting Kraven to dispose of the hero. With Kraven, the Chameleon battled Iron Man, and then confronted the Hulk. At one point, the Chameleon disguised himself as Hank Pym, and robbed Pym's laboratory for documents to combat Virus Nine. While delivering the documents and a shrunken Hulk to HYDRA, he was encountered and defeated by Ant-Man. The Chameleon disguised himself as the Torpedo and battled Daredevil.

When his half-brother committed suicide, the Chameleon became obsessed with making Spider-Man suffer for his failure to prevent this. He ingested a serum which made his face permanently featureless and malleable. He attempted to kidnap America's leading expert on superconductors, but was thwarted by Spider-Man. He then kidnapped J. Jonah Jameson. He approached the Maggia for support to be New York's new crime lord, and formed an alliance with Hammerhead. Disguised as a scientist, the Chameleon temporarily removed Spider-Man's powers. He allied himself with the Femme Fatales, the Scorpion, and the Tarantula to eliminate Spider-Man and the Black Cat, but escaped when his plan failed.

The Chameleon's most ambitious play against Spider-Man happened when he formed an alliance with Harry Osborn as the Green Goblin. Before Harry's death, the Chameleon was told Spider-Man's secret identity could be found through Peter Parker, to construct androids of Peter's parents; the Chameleon later admitted that he went through with the plot to confirm once and for all that Peter was Spider-Man. The plan led to a psychotic breakdown for both Spider-Man and the Chameleon, Spider-Man briefly renouncing the civilian identity while the Chameleon is sent to Ravencroft Asylum. But when Doctor Ashley Kafka sneaks him into a basement to try to continue treating him in the belief that he was close to a breakthrough when the court were preparing to put him on trial, the Chameleon escaped and attempted to convince Spider-Man of actually a hallucinating writer who had suffered a mental breakdown after his daughter's death in a car accident but Peter managed to break through this deception due to his own strength of will. The Chameleon's confirmation of Spider-Man's secret identity led him to try to attack Spider-Man through family and friends but this effort met with rather dismal results when Mary Jane Watson subdued him with a baseball bat. Somewhere in between this and subsequent appearances, he appeared to have been destroyed by his nephew Alyosha Kravinoff; Alyosha later threw a Chameleon mask at Spider-Man's feet, referring to it as 'That weakling Dmitri' but apparently recovered, waking in a hospital.

After tricking Spider-Man to the bridge where Gwen Stacy's death occurred, on the pretext of having kidnapped Mary Jane, he declared his own loneliness and love for Peter. When Peter laughed, he threw himself off the bridge. He reappeared some time later in a mental institution, completely incapacitated, believing himself to be Sergei Kravinoff rather than his true self. He later reappeared in his Chameleon identity as part of the Sinister Twelve villain team organized by Norman Osborn as the Green Goblin.

After Spider-Man was unmasked, the Chameleon gathered a gang of villains called the Exterminators, including Will O' The Wisp, Scarecrow, Swarm and Electro, and also blackmailed the Molten Man into his employ all in an effort to defeat Spider-Man and attack the web-slinger's family.

However, the Chameleon was dealt a most humiliating defeat by May Parker's hands, when he attempted to trick May into believing he was Peter, then murder May. But May was not fooled by any means, and defeated the villain with a plate of oatmeal-raisin cookies laced with Ambien. The Rhino was also employed as part of the team up and later defeated Spider-Man only to be unable to collect payment from the Chameleon as he was already captured.

After the "Civil War", the Chameleon showed up among the villains at Stilt-Man's funeral at the Bar with No Name where the Punisher poisoned the drinks and blew up the bar.

The Chameleon next appeared in the newest incarnation of Super Villain Team-Up called MODOK's Eleven. In this limited series, it is revealed that he contacted A.I.M. the moment he was telepathically summoned by MODOK. He then allowed A.I.M. to send in their newest creation, the Ultra-Adaptoid, under the guise of the Chameleon. Additionally, it was revealed in Super Villain Team-Up: MODOK's Eleven that his apparent insanity and demise years earlier were in fact well-crafted ruses designed so that he could fade into the background once more.

The "One More Day" storyline ended with the removal of Peter and Mary Jane's timeline from all memories and no one knows Spider-Man's identity, including the Chameleon.

The Chameleon returns to New York more sadistic and sociopathic than ever before. To complete his hired goal of bombing City Hall, he kidnaps Peter who works for Mayor J. Jonah Jameson. While posing as Parker, he tries to better his life, revealing that he always tries to rectify the problems in the lives of his "faces". Using Peter's security clearance to get access to various materials, the Chameleon was poised to bomb City Hall before Peter escaped and thwarted his plans as Spider-Man. During the resulting confusion, the Chameleon escaped.

Sometime later at an alley building during "The Gauntlet and Grim Hunt" storyline, the distraught Chameleon is met by Sasha Kravinoff and Ana Kravinoff who want his help in avenging Sergei's death. Various follow up issues during The Gauntlet storyline show the Chameleon helping the Kravinoff family into creating an alliance of Spider-Man's enemies as well as Diablo. First, he and Sasha managed to spring Electro from prison. Then Chameleon approached Mysterio stating that he has friends that are "dying" to meet him. When it came to the Grim Hunt part, he posed as Ezekiel to get close to Spider-Man to defeat and bring to the Kravinoffs to sacrifice as part of a ritual that will revive Sergei. After Sergei is resurrected, the Chameleon states that the problem might stem from inward anger of being resurrected. He and the Kravinoffs discover Spider-Man's corpse, which turns out to be Kaine in Spider-Man's costume instead. The real Spider-Man goes to take revenge on the Kravenoff family. Spider-Man soon arrives and pulled the Chameleon and Alyosha into the huge nest of spiders. Sasha realizes that the Kravinoff family wasn't hunting the spiders, but it was the spiders hunting them.

During the "Origin of the Species" storyline, the Chameleon is invited by Doctor Octopus to join his supervillain team where he gets involved in securing some specific items for Doctor Octopus. He poses as Harry Osborn to trick Spider-Man by telling him that Menace's infant has died. When Spider-Man has been away, the Chameleon got the infant. Doctor Octopus later talks with the Chameleon saying that the baby is the first of a new species. Using a lead gained when he took down Shocker, Spider-Man arrives at the Kravinoff Mansion where he captures the Chameleon who reveals that the baby is still alive and is in the Lizard's clutches.

The Chameleon later becomes a member of Doctor Octopus's latest incarnation of the Sinister Six. He poses as Captain Steve Rogers to infiltrate an Air Force base. The Chameleon disguises himself as a tribal chief when he and Mysterio pull off a zombie pirate attack on some natives. Using robots of the other Sinister Six members, Chameleon and Mysterio pulled off this scheme as a diversion so that Doctor Octopus and the other Sinister Six members can infiltrate the Baxter Building to look for specific technology plans while the Future Foundation were investigating the more obvious threat.

The Chameleon later poses as Klaw to infiltrate Intelligencia so that he can help the Sinister Six steal their Zero Cannon.

During the "Ends of the Earth" storyline, the Chameleon was present with the Sinister Six when Doctor Octopus tells them about a master plan. The Chameleon was present at Palazzo Senatorio at a summit where the world's greatest minds and the world leaders is carried out to discuss about Doctor Octopus's supposed offer to save the world with the Chameleon disguised as Al Gore. As Al Gore, the Chameleon states that Doctor Octopus would save them. Without a counter-argument, Spider-Man punches Al Gore and reveals to everyone present that Al Gore is actually the Chameleon in disguise. Spider-Man's new costume could detect which person is actually the Chameleon based on heartbeats. A transmission from Doctor Octopus states activating the Octavian Lens which are blocking the harmful UV rays from the sun to reinforce this offer. After letting the Chameleon go, Spider-Man secretly places a Spider-Tracer on the Chameleon so that the Avengers could follow him. They follow the Chameleon to the Mediterranean Coasts where the Sinister Six is waiting for the Chameleon. Using many of the stolen objects, the Sinister Six successfully subdue the Avengers leaving only Spider-Man standing. After Spider-Man and the Black Widow escape with Silver Sable's help, the Chameleon suggest that since the Sinister Six's remaining members had each received their $2 billion and their criminal records expunged, they should just leave Doctor Octopus and his scheme. But they stay on board as that would make an enemy out of Doctor Octopus. The Chameleon later gets involved with Mysterio in tricking Spider-Man's allies into thinking they were destroying Symkaria, to give Doctor Octopus more time to complete the 200 satellites. However, the Chameleon is captured and the Black Widow threatens to reveal the secret behind his real face.

Following the "Dying Wish" storyline, the Chameleon later fights Superior Spider-Man (Otto Octavius's mind in Spider-Man's body) and the Secret Avengers on the S.H.I.E.L.D. Helicarrier. The Chameleon ends up knocked unconscious and the Superior Spider-Man transports him to his hidden underwater lab where he ends up imprisoned. The Chameleon, Electro, Sandman, Mysterion, and the Vulture are later seen as part of the "Superior Six" team. The Superior Spider-Man has been temporarily controlling their minds to redeem them for their crimes, doing this by forcing them do heroic deeds against their will which almost get some of them killed. Every time they are done being controlled, they are put back in their containment cells. They eventually break free of the Superior Spider-Man's control and attempt to exact revenge, while nearly destroying New York to do so. With Sun Girl's help, the Superior Spider-Man is barely able to stop the Superior Six.

Following the true Spider-Man's return, the Chameleon attempts to drive Spider-Man insane as revenge for the Superior Spider-Man's earlier treatment of him. However, Deadpool switches costumes with Spider-Man, with the Chameleon unaware of this. He fails at driving Deadpool insane (as Deadpool is already insane), and ends up being shot in the leg by him. Both heroes (in each other's costumes) punch the Chameleon at the same time, knocking him out and later delivered him to the authorities.

At the conclusion of the "Hunted" storyline, the Chameleon is revealed to be one of the attendees at Sergei's funeral as he is pleased that Sergei spared him from the Great Hunt. As he walks away, the Chameleon quotes to his dead stepbrother to sleep well and states "You needn't worry. The world is no longer your burden. Besides, there won't be much of it left soon... Not by the time I've finished."

During the "Chameleon Conspiracy" storyline, Chameleon was imprisoned in a Symkarian black site prison called the Hiding Place when Teresa Parker infiltrated it so that she can interrogate him about his connection with Harry Osborn and the use of the Life Model Decoys of her parents. While stating that she IS a Parker, Teresa dragged Chameleon to another cell which is holding her parents' killer Finisher who is still alive after his apparent death at the hands of Spider-Man. Chameleon claimed that he has the answers she needs. Teresa did a non-fatal shot to Finisher as she still needs answers from him as Chameleon assured. Chameleon and Finisher admitted to Teresa that Chameleon faked Finisher's death to fool Spider-Man. Upon them relocating to another building, Finisher is shown to have a plethora of people resembling Chameleon which made Chameleon feel uncomfortable. As Spider-Man finds that some of the Jack O'Lanterns were unmasked to be Chameleon-resembling people, Finisher revealed to Teresa that Chameleon was adopted at a young age by Gustav Fiers. Then Chameleon revealed that they never left the Hiding Place and that Finisher was using holographic technology to speak with Teresa as Chameleon states that she can use the Clairvoyant to find the rest of the answers she needs. Upon meeting up with Spider-Man, he wanted her to use the Clairvoyant as Teresa has a flashback to Chameleon's claim that she is a Chameleon double agent. Not wanting confirmation on this, Teresa breaks the Clairvoyant and states that she IS a Parker while planning to track down Finisher. Back in his cell while reading a Leo Tolstoy book, Chameleon is approached by Kindred who wants some more serum while also stating that he can see his true face. Chameleon states that he is happy to do business with Osborn again.

Powers and abilities
Originally, the Chameleon had no superhuman powers and simply used makeup and elaborate costuming to impersonate his targets. To do this, he implemented a device in a belt buckle that emitted a gas that helped him mold his features. Later, the Chameleon obtained a microcomputer from Spencer Smythe for his belt buckle that could be programmed with the facial features of hundreds of people. The belt buckle also contains a video receiver that enables the computer to analyze the appearance of anyone the Chameleon encounters so that it can duplicate his/her features using electrical impulses. The computer utilizes holographic technology that allowed him to change his appearance at the push of a button. His electronic devices allowed him to appear as two different people to two separate observers simultaneously. The Chameleon's costume consists of "memory material" that can be altered by electrical impulses from his belt so as to resemble the clothing of the person he is impersonating.

Later, the Chameleon's powers are made innate: his skin pigmentation have been surgically and mutagenically altered by a serum so that he can take on the appearance of any person at will. He also wears fabric made of memory material that responds to nerve impulses and can appear to be whatever costume he wishes to be.

When his past friendship with Kraven the Hunter was revealed, it was also revealed that the Chameleon had taken the same serums that Kraven had taken over the years. This would suggest that the two characters were of a similar age (over 70 years old). It would also suggest that the Chameleon's physical strength and endurance could be somewhat augmented, but as the Chameleon's strength is much lower than that of Kraven, his augmentations may not reach a superhuman level.

Aside from his physical advantages, the Chameleon is a master of disguise, and a brilliant method actor and impressionist. He is also a master of creating lifelike masks and make-up. He is a quick-change artist who can assume a new disguise in less than a minute, although he no longer needs to use such skills. He also speaks several languages fluently. Although the Chameleon is not a scientific genius, during his increased lifespan he has been exposed to a wide array of sophisticated experimental technology, much of which he can apply effectively in his nefarious schemes.

In his 2010 appearances in The Amazing Spider-Man, writer Fred Van Lente placed a stronger emphasis on his skills of disguise rather than his superhuman powers. In this portrayal, Chameleon kidnaps people and brutally kills them by dumping them in an acid bath. From listening to them beg for their lives, he alters his pitch to sound exactly alike and takes a face print to make into a mask. This more chilling Chameleon also seeks to fix the lives of his "faces", attempting to rectify the problems of their lives while he poses as them as a part of some warped heroic view of himself.

Reception
 In 2014, WhatCulture ranked Chameleon 3rd in their "7 Unused Spider-Man Villains Who'd Be Great In The Marvel Cinematic Universe" list.

IGN ranked the Chameleon as Spider-Man's 14th greatest enemy.

Other versions

Chameleon 2099
In Marvel 2099, a designer drug that causes its users to involuntarily shapeshift in response to whatever emotion they are feeling at the time is nicknamed "Chameleon". After fighting an addict (who turned into a bull-like monster when angered and a mouse-like creature when frightened) at Woodstock 2099, the era's Spider-Man tracks down the distributor of the Chameleon, a hippy known as Major Jones. While battling Jones and his minions, Spider-Man accidentally knocks the dealer into his supply of the drug, causing him to mutate into an amorphous blob and consequently the new Chameleon.

Chameleon 2211
A version of Chameleon appeared in Friendly Neighborhood Spider-Man. He has the powers of physically changing into any shape or form after accessing their DNA. This usually involves sampling their blood after killing the subject, although less lethal methods are possible; he was able to change into Sandman after an accidental ingestion of some of his sand.

Chameleon encounters an alternate Uncle Ben from another future who has been transferred into the 'main' timeline by Hobgoblin of 2211, attempting to influence Ben to kill Edwin Jarvis for his current involvement with this timeline's May Parker by arguing that, since the multiverse means every action possible is being committed, you might as well do what feels good. When Ben rejects the suggestion, Chameleon kills and replaces him. This fools Spider-Man 2211 whom he then kills when he arrives to try to return 'Ben' to his reality. After discovering the body, Sandman's father was framed for Ben's murder, and Sandman went to Spider-Man for help.

The two encountered Chameleon at Peter's high school (Chameleon had murdered the principal and was posing as him), where Chameleon reveals that he wasn't human at all but a giant monster. Chameleon was finally defeated, however, after Spider-Man (of Earth 616) used Spider-Man 2211's helmet to literally "administer poetic justice", causing a last-minute body switch between Chameleon and Sandman's father into an electric chair.

Counter-Earth
Spider-Man faces the Counter-Earth version of The Chameleon in Spider-Man Unlimited #5. This Chameleon, a reptilian Bestial, is a depraved serial killer who both Spider-Man and a bestial Wolverine team-up to defeat.

Ultimate Marvel
The Ultimate Marvel version of Dmitri Smerdyakov is alluded on a list of cat burglars in the Daily Bugle database.

The Ultimate version of Chameleon are two unnamed twin siblings with the ability to shape-shift. One poses first as J. Jonah Jameson, and later Spider-Man, while the other (referred to as "Camellia") keeps the real Jameson and Peter Parker restrained. The Chameleon twins are defeated by Johnny Storm and Bobby Drake, and imprisoned in the Triskelion.

Marvel Action Hour: Iron Man
In Iron Man during The Marvel Action Hour, the Chameleon appeared in #4 of the cartoon based comic in service to Justin Hammer. He used his transformation abilities to obtain the Grim Reaper weapon from Stark Enterprises.

Marvel Noir
The Marvel Noir version of Dmitri Smerdyakov (a.k.a. The Chameleon) has the ability to alter his features to imitate any individual, although this ability stems from his clay-like malleable features rather than his mainstream counterpart's technological advantages. He is a former Coney Island freak working for mob boss Norman Osborn (a.k.a. "The Goblin") by impersonating J. Jonah Jameson to eliminate Ben Urich and set a trap for Spider-Man. He is killed by Felicia Hardy who witnesses him as Jameson killing Ben.

In other media

Television
 The Chameleon appears in The Marvel Super Heroes, voiced by Tom Harvey.
 The Chameleon appears in the Spider-Man (1981) episode "Arsenic and Aunt May", voiced by John H. Mayer.
 The Chameleon appears in the Spider-Man and His Amazing Friends episode "Seven Little Superheroes", voiced by Hans Conried.
 The Chameleon appears in Spider-Man: The Animated Series, voiced by multiple voice actors per his disguises while having no dialogue in his true form. An international hitman and spy working for criminals such as the Kingpin and his son Richard Fisk, this version initially wore a belt-mounted camera device capable of capturing a person's image so he can disguise himself as that person before undergoing experiments to gain natural shapeshifting capabilities via Alistair Smythe. Chameleon eventually joins the Kingpin's Insidious Six, only to swiftly betray the group to join his foster father, the Red Skull.
 The Chameleon appears in The Spectacular Spider-Man, voiced by Steve Blum. This version uses lifelike masks like his original comics counterpart. Chronologically, he first appears in the episode "The Uncertainty Principle", posing as Norman Osborn to steal Oscorp's secrets for an anonymous client. He formally debuts in the episode "Persona", using Phineas Mason's machines and Quentin Beck's special effects to pose as Spider-Man and commit a series of robberies. He is eventually unmasked and defeated by the real Spider-Man and the Black Cat during a yacht robbery, but he escapes custody by posing as a police officer. In the series finale "Final Curtain", the Chameleon is hired to pose as Osborn while the latter fights Spider-Man as the Green Goblin. Harry Osborn, however, eventually sees through his disguise and unmasks the Chameleon before the latter escapes.
 The Chameleon appears in Spider-Man (2017), voiced by Patton Oswalt. This version uses a face mask developed by Raymond Warren capable of capturing a person's image to disguise himself. In the four-part episode "Bring on the Bad Guys", he poses as the mastermind behind a bounty on Spider-Man per Doctor Octopus's orders. The Chameleon frames Spider-Man for a bank robbery and escapes the web-slinger by impersonating various individuals, but he is eventually exposed and arrested. In the two-part episode "Generations", the Chameleon poses as Maria Corazon to infiltrate Horizon High and fights the Spider-Team with the Tarantula battle suit until Spider-Girl eventually sees through his disguise and defeats the Chameleon.

Marvel Cinematic Universe 
Variations of the Chameleon appear in media set in the Marvel Cinematic Universe:
 Dimitri Smerdyakov, credited as simply "Dimitri", appears in the live-action MCU film Spider-Man: Far From Home, portrayed by Numan Acar. This version is an associate of the Skrull, Talos, who poses as the bus driver for Peter Parker's class during their school trip across Europe.
 The Chameleon will appear in the Disney+ animated series Spider-Man: Freshman Year.

Video games
 The Chameleon appears in the SNES version of Spider-Man (1995).
 The Chameleon appears in The Amazing Spider-Man 2, voiced by Glenn Steinbaum. This version works for the Kingpin and posed as Donald Menken to oversee his employer's experiments at Ravencroft and help him take over Oscorp.

Miscellaneous
The Chameleon appears in the Sinister Six novel trilogy by Adam-Troy Castro.

References

External links
 Chameleon at Marvel.com

Characters created by Stan Lee
Characters created by Steve Ditko
Comics characters introduced in 1963
Fictional actors
Fictional assassins in comics
Fictional characters with slowed ageing
Fictional characters with superhuman durability or invulnerability
Fictional impostors
Fictional murderers
Fictional professional thieves
Fictional Russian people
Fictional secret agents and spies
Fictional Soviet people
Hydra (comics) agents
Marvel Comics characters who are shapeshifters
Marvel Comics characters with superhuman strength
Marvel Comics male supervillains
Marvel Comics mutates
Spider-Man characters
Villains in animated television series